Edward Kendall may refer to:

 Edward Calvin Kendall (1886–1972), American biochemist
 Edward H. Kendall (1842–1901), American architect
 Edward Augustus Kendall (1776–1842), translator, social campaigner and miscellaneous writer
 Edward Nicholas Kendall (1800–1845), English hydrographer, Royal Navy officer, and polar explorer
 Edward "Ned" Kendall (1808–1861), American bandleader and bugler

See also
 Edward Kendall Crace (1844–1892), Australian pastoralist